Zhu Shujing (born 24 May 1985) is a Chinese triple jumper.

He won the silver medal at the 2004 World Junior Championships and finished seventh at the 2006 Asian Games. At the 11th Chinese National Games in 2009 he scored a personal best to take the silver behind Li Yanxi.

His personal best jump is 17.41 metres, achieved in October 2009 in Jinan.

Competition record

References

1985 births
Living people
Chinese male triple jumpers
Athletes (track and field) at the 2006 Asian Games
Asian Games competitors for China